Kavalyow or Kavaliou, or Kavalyova, Kavaliova (feminine; Кавалёва), is a common Belarusian surname, an equivalent of the English "Smith" and Russian "Kovalyov" (derived from the Belarusian  word kaval, which means blacksmith). 

The surname may refer to:
Aleh Kavalyow, Belarusian professional footballer
Viktoria Kavaliova, Belarusian ice dancer
Yury Kavalyow, Belarusian professional footballer

Belarusian-language surnames
be:Кавалёў